College of Western Idaho (CWI) is a public community college in Southwest Idaho with its primary campus locations in Boise and Nampa. CWI also offers classes at several community locations throughout the Treasure Valley. It is one of four comprehensive community colleges in Idaho and is governed by a five-member board of trustees elected at large by voters in Ada and Canyon counties.

CWI offers over 60 academic transfer and professional-technical programs leading to an Associate of Arts or Science degree, Associate of Applied Science degree, and certificates. CWI also offers basic education skills to help upgrade your existing skills, prepare for the GED, and learn English, dual credits for high school students, and fast-track career training for working professionals or people seeking to enter the workforce. In the fall of 2019, CWI's enrollment was 31,350, with 20,576 credit students and 10,774 students taking non-credit courses. Ada County residents comprised 52% of the CWI student body, while 31% of students come from Canyon County..

History
Prior to the creation of CWI, Boise was one of the largest metropolitan statistical areas in the United States without a community college. CWI was created on May 22, 2007, when voters of Canyon and Ada counties passed a measure to allow the formation of the new community college district. In June 2007, the Albertson Foundation announced it was donating $10 million to help found the college.

In July 2007, the Idaho State Board of Education selected an initial five-member board of trustees. The following month Boise State University faculty member Dennis Griffin was named to a two-year term as the college's first president and CWI began offering academic classes on January 20, 2009, with an enrollment of over 1,100 students. In the summer of 2009 the professional-technical programs from Boise State University's Selland College of Applied Technology transitioned to CWI. By the fall 2009 semester, CWI enrollment had expanded to over 3,600 students.

In January 2010, CWI applied for accreditation from the Northwest Commission on Colleges and Universities (NWCCU). NWCCU granted candidacy status at the associate degree level in 2012 and initial accreditation in 2016.

President Griffin retired in August 2009 and was succeeded by Bert Glandon. After serving as president for 12 years, Glandon retired from CWI on May 15, 2021. The college's board of trustees named Denise Aberle-Cannata the interim president.

CWI Board of Trustees extended an offer to Gordon Jones on Dec. 9, 2021 to be the next president at College of Western Idaho. Gordon Jones accepted the position of President at CWI and began his tenure as the third president in CWI's history on Jan. 10, 2022.

Student life
CWI has a growing campus life with over 30 student clubs and organizations. Student clubs have been created with academic focus as well as special interests. Student groups range from art to physics, horticulture, psychology, Glee, Birdies and Bogies, a Veterans Association, and more.

The Associated Students of the College of Western Idaho (ASCWI) serve as the voice of the student body. ASCWI is governed by five officers and eight senators elected by the student body each spring.

CWI students participate in competitive, skills-based organizations like Business Professionals of America, SkillsUSA, and Speech and Debate. CWI students have found success at state, regional, and national levels in all three organizations. CWI Speech and Debate captured seven Pi Kappa Delta Community College National Championships in 2011, 2012, 2013, 2015, 2016, 2017, and 2018. Students have earned individual medals at national skills competitions as well.

Students have the opportunity to engage on campus through the CWI Presidential Ambassador Program, which promotes leadership and connects students to campus and community events. Students are eligible to receive a scholarship as part of this program.

Locations
CWI's primary campuses are located in Boise and Nampa.

Ada County Campus

Lynx Building - 9300 W. Overland Road, Boise, Idaho
One Stop Student Services

Mallard Building - 9100 W. Black Eagle Drive, Boise, Idaho
Academic Transfer Courses
Basic Skills Education Programs
Community Learning Center

Pintail Center - 1360 South Eagle Flight Way, Boise, Idaho
 Academic Transfer Courses
 Career Technical Education Programs
 Library
 Tutoring
 Math Solutions Center

Quail Building - 1450 S. Eagle Flight Way, Boise, Idaho
Advising
Career and Technical Education Programs
Workforce Development Health Courses

Canyon County Center - 2407 Caldwell Boulevard, Nampa, Idaho
 Academic Transfer Courses
 Career and Technical Education Programs
 Basic Skills Education Programs
 Business Partnerships / Workforce Development Courses
 One Stop Student Services (limited services)
 Tutoring
 Community Learning Center
 Advising

CWI Horticulture - 2444 Old Penitentiary Road, Boise, Idaho
 Horticulture Technology Program

Nampa Campus

Academic Building - 5500 E. Opportunity Drive, Nampa, Idaho
 Academic Transfer Courses
 Advising
 Student Life Center
 Tutoring
 Math Solutions Center

Administration Building - 6056 Birch Lane, Nampa, Idaho
 Administrative Offices

Aspen Classroom Building- 6002 Birch Lane, Nampa, Idaho
 Academic Transfer Courses
 Boise State Center

Micron Education Center - 5725 E. Franklin Road, Nampa, Idaho
 Career and Technical Education Programs
 Academic Transfer Courses
 One Stop Student Services
 Workforce Development Courses
 Advising
 Bookstore
 Assessment and Testing Center
 Tutoring

Multipurpose Building - 6042 Birch Lane, Nampa, Idaho
 Library
 Advising
 Early Childhood Education Program

Academics

CWI offers over 100 majors through Academic Transfer and Professional Technical Education programs, Basic Skills Education, and fast-track career training for working professionals. Students can choose from a variety of transfer programs with 27 different majors that can result in Associate of Arts or Associate of Science degrees. CWI provides a number of free programs designed to upgrade basic skills, prepare for the GED, or learn to speak English. Through its Business Partnerships / Workforce Development division, CWI provides short-term training designed to boost job skills and earn certifications that professionals need. CWI also offers a number of short-term online courses, as well as customized training options for businesses, and opportunities for students to earn college credits while still in high school through the college's Dual Credit and Tech Prep programs. CWI's Professional Technical Education programs are designed to provide comprehensive training in just four to 24 months so that students can move on to an exciting new career. CWI offers 32 professional-technical programs that can result in Associate of Applied Science degrees, advanced technical certificates, technical certificates, and postsecondary technical certificates.

The CWI Division of Instruction is organized into 6 Schools:

School of Arts and Humanities
School of Business, Communication, and Technology
School of Health
School of Industry, Engineering, and Trades
School of Math and Science
 School of Social Sciences and Public Affairs

Athletics

CWI does not currently offer athletics and does not have an official mascot but is considering adopting one (and has had an unofficial mascot of a Unicorn).

CWI Foundation

As the only charitable, nonprofit organization dedicated to supporting CWI, the CWI Foundation plays a vital role in helping the college meet its diverse missions. The foundation works in partnership with the community to help students access education by awarding scholarships, providing start-up funds for new educational programs, and funding the long-term capital plans to support growth and provide vital educational opportunities for the community.

References

External links
Official website

Vocational education in the United States
Educational institutions established in 2007
Buildings and structures in Canyon County, Idaho
Education in Canyon County, Idaho
Education in Boise, Idaho
Community colleges in Idaho
2007 establishments in Idaho